Noisy investigations are used by the Church of Scientology to intimidate, harass, and attack their enemies. The Church used to openly label such people as Fair Game.  The goal of a noisy investigation may not be to find out anything, but to harass the person being investigated.  The procedure is to contact friends, neighbours, co-workers, etc. and inform them that they are investigating crimes by the targeted individual.

A 1966 Hubbard Communications Office Executive Letter entitled "How to do a NOISY Investigation" described the practice as:

The investigation may also be undertaken by hired detectives.

A memo, reprinted in the British paper "People", said: "We want at least one bad mark on every psychiatrist in England, a murder, an assault, or a rape or more than one.... This is Project Psychiatry. We will remove them."

Some Scientologists claim that their policy of "Fair Game" is no longer in effect, but critics of the Church maintain that whether the rule is still written in Scientology policy or not, the policy is still adhered to today. Some ex-Scientologists have claimed that the cancellation of the policy only cancelled the use of the words "fair game" and did not change the actual policy.

See also
 Dead Agenting
 Suppressive Person
 Fair Game (Scientology)
 R2-45

Notes

References
 Attacking the Attackers

Scientology beliefs and practices
Scientology-related controversies